, also known as Heya Camp, is a Japanese manga series written and illustrated by Afro and a short spin-off of Laid-Back Camp. It has been serialized by Houbunsha on Kirara Base since April 9, 2016, and on their manga service Comic Fuz since March 12, 2019. The manga was later adapted into an anime series written by Mutsumi Ito and directed by Masato Jinbo, which was aired in Japan from January 6 to March 23, 2020. Selected chapters of the manga were later adapted into live action, which was shown at the end of every episode of the second season of the live-action version of Laid-Back Camp.

Premise

The manga series, according to Afro, is an "extra edition" of Laid-Back Camp that focuses on having a chat in the club room. The anime series follows Nadeshiko Kagamihara killing time inside the room of the Outdoor Activities Club, a club in Motosu High School, when Chiaki Ōgaki and Aoi Inuyama announce their plan to go on a trip and drag her on a journey across Yamanashi Prefecture.

Media

Manga
Houbunsha began serializing Room Camp in Japan on Kirara Base, the official section of the publisher on the website Niconico Seiga, on April 9, 2016. The publisher's manga service Comic Fuz announced in February 2019 the addition of the manga along with Laid-Back Camp in their catalog, while its serialization on Kirara Base continues. The manga was added on March 12, 2019. Comic Fuz announced in November 2019 the creation of a separate section for the manga to address the difficulty of the readers when reading it and Laid-Back Camp on the same section. , a total of 134 chapters (called ) have been serialized on Comic Fuz.

Anime

In July 2018, producer Shōichi Hotta approached animation producer Ryoji Maru with a project that includes the second season of Laid-Back Camp, a short anime, and a film. In October 2018, the short anime series was announced. In April 2019, Masato Jinbo was announced as the director, Mutsumi Ito as the series composition writer, Mutsumi Sasaki as the character designer and chief animation director, and Laid-Back Camp (2018) director Yoshiaki Kyogoku as the supervisor of the series at C-Station, with DeNA producing it. The series revolves around the idea of a "stamp rally". Ito ensured that viewers would feel as satisfied as they would after viewing an episode of Kuishinbo! Mansai, a weekly Japanese cooking mini-program. The staff did location scouting to feature them in the series. Akiyuki Tateyama composed the series through film scoring, while Asaka performed the ending theme music "The Sunshower" composed by Eri Sasaki. Asaka felt that the theme music gave an "after-school" feeling and described it as a "kind of song that goes well with sunsets".

The series began airing in Japan on AT-X, Tokyo MX, and BS11 on January 6, 2020, and on YBS on January 12. Crunchyroll and Ani-One also streamed the series on its premiere. In November 2022, the series became available to view on Amazon Prime Video in Japan.

FuRyu released the series on Blu-ray and DVD in Japan on May 27, 2020. They include a special episode titled "Sauna, Food, and a Three-Wheeler", directed by Kyogoku from a script written by Laid-Back Camp series composition head Jin Tanaka. It was first streamed on YouTube for one day on April 29, 2020, and was added on Crunchyroll on March 4, 2021, and on Ani-One on April 17.

Episode list

Live action
In March 2021, a live-action adaptation of the manga series was announced to be aired along with the second season of the live-action version of Laid-Back Camp.

Notes

References

External links
 Room Camp at Kirara Base by Houbunsha 
 Room Camp at Comic Fuz 
 Official anime website 
 
 

2020 Japanese television series debuts
2020 Japanese television series endings
Anime series based on manga
C-Station
Camping in anime and manga
Houbunsha manga
Japanese webcomics
Seinen manga